Pierpont may refer to:

Surname 
 Francis Harrison Pierpont (1814–1899), Governor of Virginia
 Harry Pierpont (1902–1934), Prohibition-era gangster
 James Pierpont (minister) (1659–1714), founder of Yale University
 James Lord Pierpont (1822–1893), musician and soldier
 James Pierpont (mathematician) (1866–1938), American mathematician
 John Pierpont (1785–1866), American poet, teacher, lawyer, merchant, and minister
 Lena Pierpont (1883–1958), Prohibition-era figure
 Pierpont (Australian Financial Review) (born 1937), alter-ego of Trevor Sykes, financial journalist

Middle name 
 John Pierpont Morgan (1837–1913), American financier and banker
 John Pierpont Morgan, Jr. (1867–1943), American banker, finance executive, and philanthropist
 Samuel Pierpont Langley (1834–1906), American astronomer, and physicist, inventor

Places in the United States
 Pierpont, South Dakota
 Pierpont, Ohio
 Pierpont Township, Ashtabula County, Ohio
 Pierpont, Monongalia County, West Virginia
 Pierpont, Wyoming County, West Virginia

See also
Pierrepont (disambiguation)